{{DISPLAYTITLE:C17H14O8}}
The molecular formula C17H14O8 (molar mass : 346.28 g/mol, exact mass : 346.068867) may refer to :
 Axillarin, a flavonol
 Eupatolitin, a flavonol
 Spinacetin, a flavonol 
 Syringetin, a flavonol